Jacqueline Nkole (born 5 August 1998) is a Zambian international footballer who plays as a defender for the Zambia women's national football team. She competed for Zambia at the 2018 Africa Women Cup of Nations, playing in one match.

References

1998 births
Living people
Zambian women's footballers
Zambia women's international footballers
Women's association football defenders